Oskaloosa Township may refer to the following townships in the United States:

 Oskaloosa Township, Clay County, Illinois
 Oskaloosa Township, Jefferson County, Kansas